Hydrocynus is a genus of large characin fish in the family Alestidae commonly called "tigerfish," native to the African continent. The genus name is derived from Ancient Greek ὕδωρ ("water") + κύων ("dog"). (In fact, this fish is popularly referred to as poisson chien (dog fish) in French-speaking West Africa.) The genus contains five species, all popularly known as "African tigerfish" for their fierce predatory behaviour and other characteristics that make them excellent game fish. Hydrocynus are normally piscivorous, but H. vittatus is proven to prey on birds in flight.

Evolutionary history
The earliest fossils which have been identified as belonging to Hydrocynus are dated as Late Miocene, and have been found from the Chad, Maronga, Turkana and Semliki basins of northern and eastern Africa, in all of which Hydrocynus species still occur. The oldest lineage appears to be that of Hydrocynus goliath, while lineages of H. brevis and H. forskahlii diverged in the Late Miocene and Pliocene while the lineages which formed H. tanzaniae and the "vittatus complex" appear in the Pliocene.

Species 
Five species of Hydrocynus tigerfish are currently recognised.
 Hydrocynus brevis (Günther, 1864) (Tigerfish)
 Hydrocynus forskahlii (G. Cuvier, 1819) (Elongate tigerfish)
 Hydrocynus goliath Boulenger, 1898 (Giant tigerfish)
 Hydrocynus tanzaniae B. Brewster, 1986 (Blue tigerfish)
 Hydrocynus vittatus Castelnau, 1861 (Striped tigerfish)

However, recent molecular analysis indicates that there might be up to five more unidentified cryptic species, although more study of the ecology and behaviour is required. This study did not support the treatment of H. vittatus as a synonym of H. forskahlii.

Economic importance
The different species tigerfish are among the most important and popular game fish species in Africa and as a result they are an important asset to the various tourist industries. They are also one of the most important components of commercial freshwater catches in Africa.

Notes and references 

Alestidae
Freshwater fish of Africa
Freshwater fish genera
Characiformes genera
Taxa named by Georges Cuvier